Wakefield is a former unincorporated community in Outagamie County, Wisconsin, United States. It is located in the village of Greenville.

Wakefield had a post office from 1852 to 1879, on land that is now occupied by Appleton International Airport. The post office (and by extension the community) was named after a Greenville settler, J. Wakefield.

Geography
Wakefield is located at  (44.265647, -88.537089) and has an elevation of 892 feet (272m).

References

Geography of Outagamie County, Wisconsin
Ghost towns in Wisconsin